The Djupadal Formation is a geologic formation in Skåne County, southern Sweden. It is Early Jurassic (probably Pliensbachian-Toarcian, or Late Toarcian) in age. It is part of the Central Skåne Volcanic Province, know by the discovery of basalt tuff layers, including Sandåkra, Korsaröd and Djupadal. An original analysis of the location of Korsaröd led to a Toarcian-Aalenian age, but was dismissed in 2016, when a series of Palynogical samples recovered a Late Pliensbachian and probably Lower Toarcian age for the Korsaröd Outcrop. The same year this result was also challenged by an in-depth study of the Lilla Hagstad neck that yield a Late Toarcian Age. The formation was deposited in the Central Skane region, linked to the late early Jurassic volcanism. The Korsaröd member includes a volcanic-derived Lagerstatten with exceptional fern finds. The data provided by fossilized wood rings showed that the location of Korsaröd hosted a middle-latitude Mediterranean-type biome in the late Early Jurassic, with low rainfall ratio, delayed to seasonal events. Superimposed on this climate were the effects of a local active Strombolian Volcanism and hydrothermal activity.



Description 
Djupadalsmölla, the original location has been known due to its volcanic Tuff and other volcanoclastic-derived facies. It was originally described in 1826 as the local basalts where identified as coming from ancient volcanic eruptions. The exposure of Anneklev, located near Höör was where the first volcanic neck was discovered, with other volcanic remnants mentioned on Jällabjär and Rallate along with the tuff at Djupadalsmölla. These deposits were described as volcanic rocks composed mostly by tuff, that includes basaltic bombs (composed by Pyroxene and pseudomorphs from this, along with Olivine on adjacent pyroclastics), accidental lithics and occasional wood from conifers, in the form of small pieces to large logs. At Djupadal the Rönne River has cut a 20 m deep valley mainly in the Precambrian basement, where Lower Jurassic strata (including volcanic tuff) form part of the southern valley side, and also occur in the valley northwestwards, indicating that the valley is partly an exhumed sub-Jurassic depression. The modern strata of the Valley is over a Late Weichselian melt-water channel and it also contains eroded fluvioglacial deposits. A nearby roadcut shows kaolinized basement beneath the Toarcian sediments and a nearby boring has penetrated 44 m of kaolinized Gneiss. The Valley Bottom exposes  small ridges and cupolas (in gneiss) and tors (mainly in Amphibolite).

Geology

The southwestern margin of the Baltic Shield in southern Sweden and adjoining off-shore basins in the Baltic Sea is characterized by a 20–60 km wide fracture zone along which Mesoproterozoic basement rocks were downfaulted and deeply buried beneath sedimentary cover of the Danish Basin and Polish Trough. The so-called Sorgenfrei–Tornquist Zone (STZ) forms part of the Tornquist Lineament, a trans-continental deep fracture system that extends for more than 1000 km from the North Sea to the Black Sea, demarcating the largely unexposed southwestern margin of the East European Craton. Towards the northern zone there are 2 two Mesoproterozoic basement complexes: the uplifted Southwest Scandinavian Gneiss Complex of the Baltic Shield and the deeply buried Danish Massif. The southern branch of the lineament forms the Tornquist–Teisseyre Zone (TTZ), which separates the Precambrian lithosphere of the East European Craton from accreted Early Paleozoic peri-Gondwanan terranes of central Europe. The STZ was result of continental rifting during the Permian-Carboniferous periods, with some zones continued until the Cretaceous, with an evolution similar to the North Sea system. This zone is known by its complex horst and graben structures that resulted from Late Cretaceous–Paleogene inversion tectonics. As result of the collapse of the Variscan Orogen 200 million years of intermittent lithospheric extension developed locally and in sister systems, developing Permian rift structures and basins, that were reactivated during the breakup of Pangea and opening of the Tethys & North Atlantic oceans during the Mesozoic.
The systemic rifting from Carboniferous to Mesozoic in the STZ was accompanied by low-volume mafic alkaline magmatism, with a 70 km wide NW-SE oriented Permo-Carboniferous Tholeiitic dyke swarm that runs across Scania and Bornholm island within the STZ. In this context, the Central Skåne Volcanic Province was developed, being a 30 by 40 km large Mesozoic volcanic field that occurs at the southern tip of the Scandinavian Peninsula, composed by 100 volcanic plugs and necks form prominent steep sided hills in central Scania. In this volcanic field either low-volume alkaline magmatism was repeatedly sourced from a common enriched Continental Lithospheric Mantle reservoir or was derived from edge-driven mantle convection by which newly inflowing asthenospheric material melted in structurally controlled positions.

Stratigraphy
The Djupadalsmölla pyroclastic reaches almost 10 m high and 20 m wide, with pyroclastics appearing also through the west more than 100 m, along the valley of the Rönne River. It is composed by a 3 m thick sequence of Jurassic rocks, starting overlying the kaolinized basement of Paleozoic Gneiss with 2 m of sandstone-claystone series ending with a single metre of green-brownish turfaceous rocks. The strata is composed by mostly small Lapilli (around 30–50% of the content) and ash (-10 mm), with some samples being red in patches. Tuff concretions are recovered locally composed mostly of coarse ash, with rich amounts of Calcite and Wood pieces. This composition indicates moderate explosivity on the genesis of the materials, relating the eruption products with short transport paths, as show little mechanical weathering, also corroborated by the thick layering and the low amount of basaltic bombs reported, while the correlation of wood and lapilli indicates a terrestrial deposition. All together shows local Strombolian Volcanism, linked probably to a coeval rift, as recovered by the presence of more than 100 coeval volcanic necks in central Scania.
Dominating the Djupadal formation is moderately sorted lapilli tuff with abundant scoria, what indicates moderate explosivity, giving the eruption products short transport paths, preventing extensive mechanical weathering, that would create rounded fragments and large amounts of ash, that along thick layers and decimetre sized basaltic bombs are clear signs of closeness to the volcanic source.

On Karup the exposed layer is 1-1.5 m high and about 5 m wide, with an unclear distribution of sediments beyond quaternary sediments superimpose the pyroclastic material, while the substrate is not exposed. This exposed layer represents one of the outcrop where the major abundance of charred pieces of wood and also silicified, non-charred pieces of wood, occur.

Lilla Hagstad is composed by this is composed of Nepheline basalt with dark glass base in which crystal individuals of nepheline, Angite, olivine and magnetite are included. Also hosts lapillas from hazelnut to pea size are rounded, provided with a dense dark solidification zone and prove thereby as subaeric ejection products and not an origin from intrusive formations on cavities or open crevices. There are also quartz grains, often shattered, which become fragments cemented by the solidifying glass mass.

On Koholma, a 0.5 m of green-brown trufaceous rocks, composed mostly by large clasts of crystalline rocks along lapilli and abundant plant remains, all identical to those seen on Djupadalsmölla, and also suggested to be derived form sliding flows from a nearby volcano.

On Snälleröd (65 m thick, 44 m saprolite) samples taken, compared with the ones from the bottom of the road cut at Djupadal at 1.5 km NNE of this last one showed  massive, soft lumps of a white, fine-grained material lacking any visually detectable grains of primary minerals, where only chemical data showed that this material is  highly depleted in Calcium, Potassium and Sodium with significant kaolinization. The kaolinized rock has Kaolinite content exceeding 85%. The samples taken at the NNE of Djudapal shows angular, gravel-sized material contains less altered granules of gneiss, remnant Feldspar and Quartz on a fraction dominated by Smectite, unlike the previous kaolinite-dominated ones, although this last one is also abundant.

The Korsaröd Lagerstatten is located also on central Scania, and represents the best outcrop of the formation, leading to exquisitely preserved (with fossilized nuclei and chromosomes) specimens of ferns of the extant genus Osmundastrum. This location was linked by Ulf Sivhed in 1984 with the Dajupadal Formation. What was corroborated by recent studies. It is also composed by volcaniclastic deposits, located at 380 m WNW of the nearest basaltic volcanic plug. It is composed by mafic clasts agruped with agglomerates, oriented to this volcanic plug, coming probably from it or nearby ones. Its clasts are angular and poorly sorted, recovered on a series of layers whose timing is uncertain, as there is no probe if represent discrete episodes separated by intervals of non-deposition or is result of variations due to a high-energy depositional setting. Like in the Dajupadalsmölla type deposit, there is a great abundance of ash/mud content of the deposit filled with chaotic distributed wood fossil, what leds to the interpretation that this was a lahar deposit. This location has been compared with modern Rotorua, New Zealand, considered an analogue for the type of environment represented in southern Sweden at this time.

Eneskogen, Bonnarp and Säte volcanic necks are the main coeval of the Formation. While Bonnarp (5–6 m height and covers roughly 5,000 square meters, covered by Jurassic sediments) is calculated to have at least 185.4+4.6 Ma (Middle Pliensbachian), Säte (Comprise two basalt pipes, each roughly 6–10 m high and some 10,000 square meters in area) yielded 180.0+0.7 Ma and Eneskogen (A large hill covered by quaternary sediments. Some few boulders and basalt pillars were exposed) 182.1+0.6 Ma, both Lower Toarcian in age. It recovers one of the tree major Mesozoic volcanic events on Skåne. Säte & Bonnarp volcanic strata is composed by Basanite, being the first Glassy Facies, and the second microcrystalline, while Eneskogen also microcrystalline, is dominated by Melanephelinite. Bonarp has a very special character, which differed considerably from the normal cone of a Stratovolcano. At Bonarp, between the crystalline basement and the basalt tuff, a sedimentary layer sequence intervenes, alternating sandy and clayey layers. The layers linked to the volcano consists of sand and clay stones with thin coal seams, with bottom redistributed disturbed layers of kaolin. The overall appearance of the Bonarp volcano suggests that local tectonic movements were more or less complete when the eruption began. The pre-basaltic weathering process was also a deep kaolinization of the crystalline basement (Knutshög, Djupadal). At Bonarp the basement is also deeply decomposed.

The Brandsberga and Kolleberga erratics represent a series of Upper Pliensbachian sandstones, linked with the Bonnarp Volcano and deposited on a marginal marine to coastal setting, with a faunal composition dominated by Bivalves, as well as Belemnnites and Bony Fish remains, yet the bivalves were the only identifiable to genus level. This unit has traces of volcanoclastic elements on it, yet is dominated by sandstones, the same that are found in the associated Dinoflajellate-rich layers of the Bonnarp Volcano. The unit is also the only part that recovers marine fauna, mostly molluscs. The erratics suggest the presence of undiscovered solid rock in the immediate vicinity, and, like on the main volcanic layers, they're abundant on large angular and rounded pieces of half-weathered Archaean sediments, probably either or result of exposed nearby layers of this period or result of the basement erosion due to coeval volcanism. The deposit was part of a regression trend where an embayment was formed in western central Skane, likely derived from the earlier Lower Pliensbachian major transgression. The presence of Kaolinite as well indeterminate Plant remains suggest the flow of terrestrial matter through rivers from the east.

Lithology
The Basalts where originally classified by Eichstädt in 1882 on its own scheme, divided in groups such as Feldspar basalts, Nepheline basalts, Leucite basalts and Glass basalts. The Basalt magmas must have been formed in the mantle and were hastily transported towards the surface during eruptions. The local basanites contain spinel-bearing and spinel-free Peridotite xenoliths. The ultramafic and mafic xenoliths document two types of petrogenetic origin: the group A, composed of Dunite, Harzburgite and Spllherzolite, whose origin is linked with the upper mantle; B, Pyroxenite, Gabbronorites, Anorthosite and mafic xenoliths that represent likely intrusive bodies, which might be located at the crust–mantle or upper crust. Beyond the Basanites, the overall lithology includes Iddingsite, Augite, Serpentinite, Magnetite, Orthoclase, Plagioclase, Olivine, Chlorite, Apatite, Titanite, Feldspar and indeterminate Glass-like particles. Mostly of the Volcanic necks host moderate to high quantities of olivine.

At Djupadalsmölla the layers are composed by a more or less transformed tuff, that is composed of volcanic ash, sand and lapilli, and small portions of completely or almost completely disintegrated basalt. The color of this rocks changes between blue-green, green-yellow, brown-yellow or brown, depending on the weathering stage in which it is located, with the greenish blue being the rocks in the healthiest state, while brownish color tones seem to indicate a more advanced decomposition. The rocks have abundant clearly distinguished rounded grains that range from the size of a pea to the size of a hazelnut. This grains compose most of the rocks, cemented together and cohesive, mostly forming Limestone cement. The cavities are generally completely filled with secondary products, mostly calcareous limestone, in addition to Zeolites and Viridite. The cement between the grains consists mainly of limnic limestone and sandstones. This rocks were originally either a feldspar basalt or Limburgite ("glass" basalt), in which both kinds of Augit and olivine are always included, albeit in varying amounts. In the Limburgites, feldspar, augit and olivine, syllic microliters (Ferrite) as well sparsely sprinkled grains of Magnetite have been reported in varying amounts. The "Glass" sections appear to have been strongly grained in most cases, but these grains did not fully correspond to the globulitic grains, which are otherwise usually found in the glass of basalts, likely made of Olivine or Augite, as well small Serpentine particles. The basalt tuff therefore came to form a porous glass, in which no other crystallized substances can be found than the olivine crystals already formed in the crater. The cement, which fills the space between the sideromelan grains and seals them together, consists for the most part of limestone, which is easily recognized under the microscope and is also clearly visible when the preparations are treated with acid. The cement is both sparse and forms a rich matrix for the sideromelan grains. Other layers are composed with red Gneiss, which is similar to that found in the area, and a sandstone, which is similar to that found at Höör. This Gneiss is recovered in the Volcanic Bombs (lapilli) along Amphibolite. These rocks are the most common around the volcanic sediments, with other layers composed of mica Diorite, limestone, clay slate and muddy, shale sandstone. In this layers wood is common, included from irregular pieces to completely preserved branch pieces.

Siliciclastic interbeds
The Siliclastic interbeds of the Djupadal Formation where originally assigned to the underliying fluvial Höör Sandstone, of Hettangian-Pliensbachian age. This interbeds outcrop in several concrete locations: Between Vitseröd and Hultarp areas, in south Hultarp and N. and S. Hultseröd, where sandstone blocks are so rare that there is no reason to assume solid sandstone,as is limited to 2 concrete blocks. At Dagstorp the layers compose an arkose, Quartzite and pebbles, with partly very large blocks, which gave rise to local quarrying. The outcrops is 350 in NO-SW and 250 in perpendicular to it, located on the slope from the large basalt cup in the north and surrounded almost entirely by bedrock. The sandstones spread to the southern side of the Dagstorpssjön lake, while the eastern boundary consists of a gneiss slab with a steep precipice to the east, which is partly Kaolin-weathered, being overlaid in the west by a rich block field of sandstone. It in this location where the interbeds are best preserved, standing firm, sheltered of bedrock and basalt. The ichnofossil Monocraterion isp. and the bivalve Cardinia follini occur in the sandstone pointing to low oligohaline faunas, yet it cannot be precisely assigned to either the uppermost Höör layers (Vittseröd Member) or the lowermost Djupadal. This faunal agruppation occurs together with abundant foliar remains and are equivalent to the Brandsberga erratics, which was closer to the mouth of the bay developed in the region, as it proves the find on its sandstone of more clear marine fauna. Farthest to the south-east, in the innermost part of the original bay, in the area around Höör train station, plant remains in abundance where embedded in the sandstone, with only a few mussels found. At 1 km west of Hallaröd there is a series of layers with blocks of quartzite gray, hard sandstone, followed 200 m N by a low ridge with crumbs, shards and blocks of weathered gneiss, probably the basis for now destroyed sandstones. The nearby sandstones of the Djupadal deposits are covered in ripple marks and clearly indicative of fluvial or lagoonal deposition, as well along Dagstorp ones, the sandstones that best evidence being deposited at the same time the volcanic eruptions take place.

Age and Correlations 
Tralau (1973) measured the age for the local deposits, establishing that where typical  Middle Late Triassic to Lias strata, with absent Middle Jurassic sediments, with the exception of the volcanic event ejecting the tuffs in Korsaröd, stating that they took place in the Middle Toarcian. Radiometric ages obtained by using K–Ar techniques scatter in a wide range between 171 and 179 Ma.  Following works on the 80s and 90s recovered also this original datation, putting this and the Dajupadalsmölla outcrop on the Toarcian-Aalenian boundary, as example of latest lower jurassic volcanism on the region. In 2006-2009 a depth study of the Volcanic Plugs led to stablish a range 191–178 Ma  based on 40Ar/39Ar whole-rock ages for samples derived from eight basanite–nephelinite plugs, with included late Jurassic and Lower Cretaceous necks. The Palynological studies on the 2014 ttought, changed the perspective of the age of the location, proposing a more fitting Late Pliensbachian based on palynology. In 2016 an in depth palynological study of the Korsaröd section led to stablish a Pliensbachian–early Toarcian(?) age, based on the high presence of the genus Perinopollenites elatoides (Pinales) and Eucommiidites troedsonii (Erdtmanithecales). Yet other more recent works support that the outcrop is Late Toarcian in age, with a more recent work recovering a high-precision 40Ar/39Ar anorthoclase feldspar age of 176.7 ± 0.5 Ma (2-sigma), Late Toarcian in the Lilla Hagstad Volcano, and not supporting the 190–110 Ma age range, and establishing the region as short lived intraplate magmatism volcanic field. This confirmed Tralau Original palynology results and the Paleomagnetic Studies done in 1993, that found 177-171 Ma as the most probable age.
The formation overlies the Höör Sandstone, and is time-equivalent with the Rydebäck and Katslösa members of the Rya Formation on NW Skane, the Röddinge Formation of the Vomb Trough and the Sorthat Formation of Denmark, with which it shares the abundance of Fern-derived material. The formation also correlates with the Fjerritslev Formation of the Danish Basin, and the Gassum Formation of the Øresund Basin.

The volcanic material was translated to the Continental margin by large fluvial channels, that ended on the sea deposits of the Green Series of Grimmen and Dobbertin, with the three-dimensional clay of this unit probably originated as the weathering product of this. The Volcanic activity very likely eroded the underlying Hettangian-Sinemurian layers of the Höör Sandstone, deposited on the Fennoscandian coast as result of the weathering of the Precambrian-Paleozoic. This is seen as, after the increased amount of clays with abundant volcanic materials, sands were repeatedly poured into the North German Basin from Skåne, as result of the erosion of the Höör sandstone.

Basin history 

Basement
The basins where the Rya Formation was deposited form part of the Sorgenfrei-Tornquist Zone (STZ) of the Trans-European Suture Zone, the boundary between Baltica to the northeast and Peri-Gondwana to the southwest. The orogeny was active in the Late Ordovician, or approximately 445 million years ago.

At the Carboniferous-Permian boundary around 300 Ma, the area was influenced by the Skagerrak-Centered Large Igneous Province, another large igneous province stretching across the North Sea, the eponymous Skagerrak between Denmark and Sweden and to the northwest up to northern England and Scotland.

Break-up of Pangea
The basins of southern Sweden and eastern Denmark were formed during the latest Triassic and earliest Jurassic. During this time the Central Atlantic magmatic province (CAMP), with an estimated  the largest igneous province in Earth's history, was formed to the present southwest of the Danish-Swedish realm. In the Skåne area, the Central Skåne Volcanic Province was active during the time of deposition of the Rya Formation, commencing around the Sinemurian-Pliensbachian boundary. The earliest magmatism was partly emplaced into and across pre-existing extensional basin structures. The main volcanic phase of this volcanic province occurred in the Early Jurassic (Pliensbachian to Toarcian) at 184–176 Ma. Analysis of the volcanic rocks produced by this Jurassic volcanism suggests a continental Strombolian-type eruptive character close to the oceans of the Early Jurassic. No correlative pyroclastic beds have yet been identified in sedimentary basins surrounding central Skåne.

Toarcian
During deposition of the Rydebäck Member of the coeval Rya Formation, the Toarcian turnover happened. This event at the Pliensbachian-Toarcian boundary characterized by widespread anoxic conditions globally, led to the extinction of various groups of flora and fauna. Taxa inhabiting the upper water column were unaffected by anoxia and included ammonites and belemnites. Epifaunal taxa adapted to low-oxygen conditions, such as the buchiids, posidoniids and inoceramids, flourished in the post-extinction environment during the survival interval.

Environment

At Djupadalsmölla the presence of wood, together with the moderately sorted lapilli tuff, indicate a terrestrial depositional environment, probably influenced by freshwater deposits. It has been suggested to be deposited on a fluvial setting that was influenced by a debris flow, mixing plants and sediments on a downhill transport, probably from the nearby Äskekull Volcano, one and a half kilometers south. This was proven by the fact there are sandstone layers with Ripple marks in the western part of the locality close to the pyroclastics. It has been suggested this sandstone underlies the volcanic sedimentary rock, yet it has abundant Silicon dioxide from the pyroclastics, implicating  the transport of large amount of this last one early after deposition, precluding major sediment compaction. This process requires a coeval age relationship between the sandstone and the lapilli tuff in Djupadalsmölla. The same category includes the lamellar deposits in the quartz grains of a dark sandstone, which Nathorst found as debris near Dagstorp Lake (Dagstorper sandstone), interpreted as a Microcline. Similar debris has also been found at Ikersberg near the Höör Train station. At Lilla Hagstad tuff changes into a similar sandstone-like that is, as its geological occurrence shows, formed in connection with the deposition of a genuinely volcanic tuff, and is therefore itself a tuff with predominantly allothigenic quartz and feldspar grains. These sandstones were also formed as tuff sandstones that were deposited during the initial phase of eruptions. The Dagstorp sandstone is filled with green stone fragments, considered basalt and Diabase, coming either from the vicinity of their current occurrence or further from the east, proving that  tuff formations in connection with the basal eruptions originally had a not inconsiderable spread. This sandstones where latter moved by rivers and deposited in both the Fennoscandian Border Zone and the Danish Basin.
Pyroclastic rain may have deposited material on slopes, with landslides to low areas as a result. Deposition in water normally creates more well-sorted deposits than those studied. However, zeolite has been enriched in Barium, which is often enriched in seawater, which probably circulated as hydrothermal flows in the lapilli tuft creating diagenetic changes, including deposition of  Calcite and Zeolite.

 
In Korsaröd there where found frashwater algae that suggest also a river influence. The data provided by the fossilized wood rings showed that the location of Korsaröd hosted a middle-latitude Mediterranean-type biome in the late Early Jurassic, with low rainfall. Superimposed on this climate were the effects of a local active Strombolian Volcanism and hydrothermal activity. This location has been compared with modern Rotorua, New Zealand, considered an analogue for the type of environment represented in southern Sweden at this time. The locality was populated mostly by Cupressaceae trees (including specimens up to 5 m in circunference), known thanks to the great abundance of the wood genus Protophyllocladoxylon and the high presence of the genus Perinopollenites elatoides (also Cupressaceae) followed by Eucommiidites troedsonii (Erdtmanithecales). Volcanogenic deposits are dominated by cypress family pollen with an understorey component rich in putative Erdtmanithecales, both representing vegetation of disturbed habitats. The abundance of Protophyllocladoxylon sp. is also related with a sporadic intraseasonal and multi-year episodes of growth disruption, probably due to the volcanic action, with rapid permineralization of woody remains, suggesting that the vegetation grew in a hydrothermal region, with major challenges for roots to cope with warm, mineral-laden fluids percolating through the soil. Pollen, spores, wood and charcoal locally indicate a complex forest community subject to episodic fires and other forms of disturbance in an active volcanic landscape under a moderately seasonal climate. Osmundastrum pulchellum, the best preserved fossil identified in this unit (whose rhizome hosts epiphytes, micro-herbivores, parasites, saprotrophs and fine organic remains) were a prominent understorey element in this vegetation and were probably involved in various competitive interactions with neighboring plant species, such as Lycophytes, whose roots have been recovered inside the Rhizome. The ferns where part of a fern and conifer rich vegetation occupying a topographic depression in the landscape (moist gully) that was engulfed by one or more lahar deposits.

Sandåkra Lake System

The jurassic layers at the north of the main volcanic outcrops include a unit known as the Sapropel of Sandåkra (south of Finjasjön). This unit is composed by a powerful layer of up to 150 m with sandstones, clays, Oil Shales, Breccias, etc., being clearly younger than the Höör Sandstone and resting directly on the Paleozoic bedrock. This subunit is known mostly by boreholes, and was shown to be in part coeval with the volcanic eruptions of the end Lower Jurassic, as samples recovered from the main Sandåkra bore where identical in abundance of volcanic minerals and hosted the same type of palynomorphs seen in Djupadal and Korsaröd. The borehole of Sandåkra includes a 70 m thick Shale/mudstone/Hialoclastite layer, indicating a water body of that depth was developed locally. This water body was interpreted as a freshwater lake on the basis of the absence of marine palynomorphs. This lake likely developed either on a tectonic breach originated from the same rifting system that give rise to the local vulcanism or in a tophographical depression, being either of the two options filled latter with sediments coming from several freshwater flows of different density from the inner hinterland, with the volcanistic minerals, only present in the uppermost sections, coming from a source far from the shoreline at the south. The enormous abundance of palynomorphs suggest the presence of estatic waters creating hydrodynamic traps, as well a stagnant lake system, like the Deer Island Lake of Michigan, allowing to a stagnation of the sediments and the development of anoxic conditions at the bottom, as proven by the Shale abundance. Ephemeral streams feed the system, while the shores where mostly composed of sandstone paleosoils. This unit developed in the lower part in a similar way to the Toarcian Sichuan Lake of the Ziliujing Formation, as well host similar to the shales of modern Kastoria Lake of Greece or the organic sapropel of the Sinove Lake of Ukraine. Towards the upper part, the evolution of the Sandåkra Lake was almost identical to the "Carapace Lake" of the Toarcian Mawson Formation, both heavily influenced by local volcanism, with either hydrothermal leaks or tuff-derived material washed by rivers and streams. An environment similar to modern Waimangu Volcanic Valley likely developed locally when the Djupadal Formation deposited.

Fossils

Pseudofungi

Fungi

Acritarchs

Dinoflajellates

Chlorophyta

Bryophyta

Lycophyta

Equisetopsida

Filicopsida

Peltaspermales

Erdtmanithecales

Gnetales

Cycadophyta

Ginkgophyta

Coniferophyta

Arachnida

See also 
 List of fossiliferous stratigraphic units in Sweden
 Kristianstad Basin
 Toarcian formations

 Mizur Formation, North Caucasus
 Sachrang Formation, Austria
 Saubach Formation, Austria
 Posidonia Shale, Lagerstätte in Germany
 Ciechocinek Formation, Germany and Poland
 Calcare di Sogno, Italy
 Marne di Monte Serrone, Italy
 Lava Formation, Lithuania
 Krempachy Marl Formation, Poland and Slovakia
 Rya Formation, Sweden

References

Bibliography
  Text was copied from this source, which is available under a Creative Commons Attribution 3.0 (CC BY 3.0) license.

  

Geologic formations of Sweden
Jurassic System of Europe
Early Jurassic Europe
Jurassic Sweden
Pliensbachian Stage
Toarcian Stage
Sandstone formations
Coal formations
Coal in Sweden
Paleontology in Sweden